Hagen is a city in the Ruhr Area, North Rhine-Westphalia, Germany.

Hagen may also refer to:

People
 Hagen (surname)
 Hagen (given name)

Places

Communities

Germany
 Hagen im Bremischen, a municipality in the district of Cuxhaven, Lower Saxony
 Hagen, Osnabrück (Hagen am Teutoburger Wald), a municipality in the district of Osnabrück, Lower Saxony
 Hagen, Schleswig-Holstein, a municipality in the district of Segeberg, Schleswig-Holstein
 Hagen (Bergen), a village administered by the Lower Saxon town of Bergen
 Hägen, a village and a former municipality in the district of Dithmarschen, Schleswig-Holstein

Elsewhere
 Hagen, Saskatchewan, Canada, a hamlet
 Hagen, Moselle, France, a commune
 Hagen, Luxembourg, a small town in the commune of Steinfort
 Mount Hagen, a major city in Papua New Guinea, simply referred to as Hagen in Tok Pisin
 Hagen Township, Clay County, Minnesota, United States

Mountains
 Hagen Mountains, Austria
 Hagen Mountains (New Guinea)
 Hagen (Randen), a mountain in the canton of Schaffhausen, Switzerland
 Mount Hagen (volcano), a volcanic mountain in the Western Highlands Province of Papua New Guinea
 Hagen Peak, British Columbia, Canada

Other places
 Hagen, Ekenäs, a park in Ekenäs, Finland
 Hagen Fjord, Greenland
 Hagen (crater), a lunar crater on the far side of the Moon

Arts and entertainment
 Hagen Quartet, an Austrian string quartet
 Hagen, Oomph!'s live performance bassist
 Hagen (TV series), a short-lived American television series
 Tom Hagen, a fictional character in The Godfather book and film series
 Mary Hagen, title character of the 1947 film That Hagen Girl, played by Shirley Temple
 Hagen, a fictional Germanic gladiator played by Ralf Moeller in the 2000 film Gladiator
 Hagen (legend), a Burgundian  warrior in tales about the Burgundian kingdom at Worms, also the villain in Wagner's opera Götterdämmerung

Other uses
 University of Hagen, a public research university in Hagen, North Rhine-Westphalia, Germany
 Rolf C. Hagen Group, a company manufacturing various products related to pets
 Hagen & Sievertsen, a former packaging and printing business in Odense, Denmark
 SMS Hagen, an Imperial German coastal defence ship
 Hagen, a subdivision of the Chimbu–Wahgi languages of Papua New Guinea

See also
 Hagen Site, Montana, United States, an archaeological site
 Hagan (disambiguation)
 Hagin, a surname